A rille is a groove-like depression in the lunar surface.

Rille may also refer to:
 Risle, river in Normandy also spelt Rille
 Rillé, village and commune in Indre-et-Loire
 Rille (grape), a variety of grape also known as Arilla

See also 
 Rill, a narrow and shallow incision into soil resulting from erosion by overland flow